Harry Ham (25 May 1886 – 27 July 1943) was a Canadian actor  from Napanee, Ontario. He died in 1943 in Beverly Hills, California.

Selected filmography
Actor
 Betty in Search of a Thrill (1915)
 Nearly a Lady (1915)
 'Twas Ever Thus (1915)
 Father and the Boys (1915)
 The Grip of Jealousy (1916)
 An Alabaster Box (1917)
 The Antics of Ann (1917)
 Her Kingdom of Dreams (1919)
 Blood Money (1921)
 The Broken Road (1921)
 The Harper's Mystery (1921)
 The Four Feathers (1921)
 Dangerous Lies (1921)
 The Spanish Jade (1922)

Producer
 God's Clay (1928)
 Glorious Youth (1929)

References

External links

1886 births
1943 deaths
Male actors from Ontario
Canadian male film actors
Canadian male silent film actors
People from Lennox and Addington County
20th-century Canadian male actors
Canadian expatriate male actors in the United Kingdom
Canadian expatriate male actors in the United States